Mohammad Ebrahim Seifpour Saadabadi (born 3 March 1938) also known as Ebrahim Seifpour, is a retired Iranian freestyle wrestler. He competed at the 1960 and 1964 Olympics and placed third and sixth, respectively. At the world championships he won two gold and one silver medals in 1961–65. After retiring from competitions he worked as a wrestling coach and official.

References

1938 births
Living people
Olympic wrestlers of Iran
Wrestlers at the 1960 Summer Olympics
Wrestlers at the 1964 Summer Olympics
Iranian male sport wrestlers
Olympic bronze medalists for Iran
Asian Games silver medalists for Iran
Olympic medalists in wrestling
Asian Games medalists in wrestling
Wrestlers at the 1966 Asian Games
World Wrestling Championships medalists
Medalists at the 1966 Asian Games
Medalists at the 1960 Summer Olympics
20th-century Iranian people
World Wrestling Champions